Ciaran Bramwell (born 12 February 2002), is an Australian professional soccer player who plays as a forward for National Premier Leagues Victoria club Melbourne Knights.

References

External links

2002 births
Living people
Australian soccer players
Association football forwards
Perth Glory FC players
Melbourne Knights FC players
A-League Men players
National Premier Leagues players